The Drop is a 2014 American crime film directed by Michaël R. Roskam and written by Dennis Lehane, based on his 2009 short story "Animal Rescue". It follows Bob Saginowski, a barman who becomes entangled in an investigation after the mafia-run bar where he works is robbed. It stars Tom Hardy, Noomi Rapace, James Gandolfini (in his final film role), and Matthias Schoenaerts.

The film was produced by TSG Entertainment and Chernin Entertainment. It premiered at the 2014 Toronto International Film Festival and was released theatrically on September 12, 2014, by Fox Searchlight Pictures. It received generally positive reviews and grossed $4.1 million during its opening weekend and $18.7 million worldwide, against a budget of $12.6 million.

Plot
In Brooklyn, Bob Saginowski tends a neighborhood bar run by his cousin Marvin Stipler, which the Chechen mafia uses as a 'drop' for illegal money. Marv ridicules Bob for commemorating the 10th anniversary of Richie “Glory Days” Whelan's unsolved murder. Bob finds a pit bull pup abandoned in a garbage can outside the home of a woman named Nadia, and they rescue the battered dog together.

When the bar is robbed by two masked gunmen, Marv is annoyed when Bob tells NYPD Detective Torres that one thief wore a broken watch. Recognizing Bob from church, Torres questions Bob's reluctance to take communion. Naming the dog Rocco, Bob bonds with Nadia, who offers to care for Rocco when Bob is at work. She later reveals that scars on her neck were self-inflicted when she struggled with drugs.

Chechen mobster Chovka threatens Marv and Bob to recover his stolen money. Meeting with one of the thieves, Fitz, Marv is revealed to have orchestrated the robbery, and a discussion with his sister Dottie reveals that he is desperate to pay for their father's life support. Bob is approached by a man who later appears at his home with proof he is Rocco's owner, but Bob refuses to return the mistreated dog.

Marv grows paranoid, and he and Bob find a bag outside the bar containing the stolen money and a severed arm with the broken watch, apparently delivered by the Chechens. Rocco's owner visits the bar, appearing to know Nadia, and Marv informs Bob that the man is Eric Deeds, who has long claimed to have killed Richie Whelan. Disposing of the arm, Bob is again questioned by Torres, and confronts Nadia. She later admits that Deeds is her unstable ex-boyfriend, but Bob assures her that he does not care about her past.

Bob and Marv return the money to the Chechens, who tell them that the bar will be the drop site on the night of the Super Bowl. When Fitz refuses to rob the bar again on the night of the drop, Marv kills him and recruits Deeds instead. Bob confronts Deeds, who demands $10,000 and threatens to reclaim and kill Rocco. Sensing Marv's plan, Bob warns him not to do something desperate again.

The day of the Super Bowl, Bob retrieves cash hidden in his basement and waits for Deeds, who instead breaks into Nadia's home and forces her to go the bar with him. At the bar, Bob hides his money and a pistol, and receives numerous deposits of mob cash throughout the night. Marv lines his car's trunk with plastic and waits near the bar, which is eventually empty except for Deeds and a frightened Nadia, who warns that Deeds has a gun. Bob offers the $10,000 for Rocco but Deeds refuses, threatening Nadia if Bob does not open the time lock safe.

Bob explains that years earlier, Marv was a loan shark skimming money from the Chechens. A customer with a large debt won a casino jackpot and paid Marv everything he owed; Marv seized the opportunity to use the customer's money to cover what he had stolen from the Chechens, leading Bob to kill the man and dispose of the body in his basement. Revealing that the man was Richie Whelan, Bob shoots Deeds dead and allows a terrified Nadia to leave. The Chechens dispose of Deeds' body and Chovka makes Bob the bar's new owner, having had Marv shot to death in his car. 

Some time later, Detective Torres offers Bob condolences for Marv's death, unconvinced it was a carjacking gone wrong. Torres asks Bob about Deeds, who has gone missing and was last seen at the bar, just as Whelan had been; Torres reveals that although Deeds took credit for Whelan's death, he was in a psychiatric ward the night Whelan went missing. Torres insinuates that Bob is responsible for both disappearances — "No one ever sees you coming, do they, Bob?" Bob visits Nadia to ask if he should stay away, but she offers to join him on a walk with Rocco.

Cast

Reception

Box office
The Drop opened in 809 theaters in North America and grossed $4,104,552, with an average of $5,074 per theater and ranking #6 at the box office. The film's widest release in the United States was 1,192 theaters and it ultimately earned $10,724,389 domestically and $7,933,992 internationally for a total of $18,658,381, above its budget of $12.6 million.

Critical response
The Drop received positive reviews from critics and has a "certified fresh" score of 89% on Rotten Tomatoes based on 204 reviews with an average score of 7.10/10. The critical consensus states "There's no shortage of similarly themed crime dramas, but The Drop rises above the pack with a smartly written script and strong cast." On Metacritic it has a score of 69 out of 100 based on 36 critics, indicating "generally favorable reviews". Particular praise was given to the performances of Tom Hardy and James Gandolfini.

Film reviewer Mike Dennis gives it 3 ½ out of 4, citing "outstanding performances, script, direction, and especially cinematography by Nicolas Karakatsanis, whose bleak rendering of Brooklyn has never been matched."

References

External links
 
 
 
 

2014 films
2014 crime films
2010s American films
2010s English-language films
American crime films
American neo-noir films
Chernin Entertainment films
Films about animal cruelty
Films about bartenders
Films about dogs
Films about organized crime in the United States
Films about pets
Films based on American short stories
Films based on works by Dennis Lehane
Films directed by Michaël R. Roskam
Films produced by Peter Chernin
Films scored by Marco Beltrami
Films set in Brooklyn
Films shot in New York City
Fox Searchlight Pictures films
Mafia films
TSG Entertainment films